"Dictator" is a 1986 song by Dutch female group Centerfold. The song was written by Centerfold member Rowan Moore, together with Peter van Asten and Richard de Bois. It was a huge hit in the Netherlands, reaching Number 6 in the Dutch Top 40 on 24 May 1986. It also appears on their debut album Man's Ruin.

Track listing

Charts

Weekly charts

Year-end charts

References

External links
 Discogs

1986 songs
1986 singles
Centerfold (group) songs